Pseudoarcte is a genus of moths of the family Noctuidae. The genus was described by Viette in 1949.

Species
 Pseudoarcte albicollis Clench, 1955
 Pseudoarcte melanis Mabille, 1890

References

Catocalinae